The Old WRUF Radio Station (later the University of Florida Police Department headquarters) was a historic site in Gainesville, Florida, United States. It was located on the University of Florida campus (on the southeast corner of Museum Road and Newell Drive). On September 21, 1989, it was added to the U.S. National Register of Historic Places.

The building was demolished in 2021 to make way for a larger, more modern UF Public Safety Building.  In lieu of demolition, an option to move the Old WRUF Radio Station a few hundred feet away was considered, but the cost to perform the move was estimated to be about $300,000.  Construction on the UF Public Safety Building began in April 2021.

See also
Buildings at the University of Florida
University of Florida
WRUF (AM)
WRUF-FM

References

External links
 Alachua County listings at National Register of Historic Places
 Alachua County listings at Florida's Office of Cultural and Historical Programs
 Virtual tour of University of Florida Campus Historic District at Alachua County's Department of Growth Management
 The University of Florida Historic Campus at UF Facilities Planning & Construction
 George A. Smathers Libraries
 UF Builds: The Architecture of the University of Florida
 Old WRUF Radio Station

National Register of Historic Places in Gainesville, Florida
Buildings at the University of Florida
Rudolph Weaver buildings
1928 establishments in Florida
School buildings completed in 1928
Radio masts and towers in the United States
History of radio